Hannity is an American conservative television political talk program on Fox News hosted by Sean Hannity. Episodes air live at 9:00 p.m. from Monday through Thursday, while episodes that air on Fridays are pre-recorded, with a repeat airing at 2:00 a.m. the following morning. The show focuses on the development of the day's events with long monologues, political analysis, and legal analysis. The show has been a part of the Fox News program lineup since January 12, 2009, and is the number one cable news broadcast in its time slot. On nights when Hannity is not available, Jason Chaffetz, Gregg Jarrett, Tammy Bruce, Dan Bongino, Jeanine Pirro and Pete Hegseth fill in as substitute hosts.

Format 
At the beginning of the show, Hannity opens with an opening monologue detailing the political issues of the day. He then transitions to clips backing evidence or showing statements of opposition forces. When Hannity finishes his opening monologue, he goes to a political & legal panel analyzing the situations on hand. After the opening segments, the show has a looser format. Hannity may go to another monologue, go to an interview, or continue with another panel.

The first guest on Hannity was former Speaker of the House Newt Gingrich. Hannity featured an exclusive interview with Don Imus during his premiere week. During the second week, conservative talk show host Rush Limbaugh appeared in an exclusive two-part interview about the future of the conservative movement and the newly inaugurated President Barack Obama.

At the end of the show, Hannity (or sometimes the special panel guest) would toss a miniature football towards the camera. On Monday through Thursday, Hannity then transitions to The Ingraham Angle by having a 30-second to two-minute chat with Laura Ingraham about a random or political topic.

Controversies

Seth Rich controversy 
In 2017, Hannity was discussing conspiracy theories involving the murder of DNC staffer Seth Rich, and on May 25, 2017, it was announced that some advertisers had cut ties to the show following the controversy and a sponsor boycott promoted by Media Matters, similar to previous sponsor boycotts targeting The Glenn Beck Program and The Rush Limbaugh Show. It was also announced that Hannity might be given a leave of absence, though Hannity vowed to return and did, and Fox confirmed he would be returning. Hannity returned to the network. Additionally, some advertisers chose not to pull their advertisements in response to Media Matters' campaign, with some publicly announcing their refusal to remove ads for various reasons, and with several companies reversing or failing to act on previous decisions to remove their advertisements.

Roy Moore comments and advertiser boycott 
In November 2017, Hannity interviewed the Alabama senate candidate Roy Moore, who was facing accusations of sexual assault and harassment of teenage girls while he was in his thirties. Hannity said Moore "deserves the presumption of innocence" and that "none of us know the truth". After criticism from Media Matters for America, which had been promoting a boycott since May 2017 over previous controversial comments by Hannity, some major advertisers pulled their advertising from Hannity's show. These actions were met with counter boycotts by Hannity's fans who destroyed products made by the companies who removed their promotions from the show and pledged to stop buying their products until the decisions were reversed, causing the CEO of one of the companies to publicly state that the public announcement of his company's removal of advertisements was "unacceptable" and that his company did not intend to take sides in the matter.

Programming announcements/changes 
Following the announcement on November 25, 2008, that Alan Colmes would leave the show, it was decided that the show would simply be entitled Hannity.

From October 7, 2013, to September 22, 2017, most Hannity episodes were pre-recorded to air in the 10:00 p.m. time-slot, occasionally airing live if a major breaking news story was being covered. Following the move to 10:00 p.m., the 9:00 p.m. time-slot was filled by several programs, including The Kelly File, Tucker Carlson Tonight, and most recently The Five, which aired at 9:00 p.m. until September 25, 2017, when Hannity returned to its original time and got a graphics makeover.

Location 
Hannity is broadcast from Studio J at 1211 Avenue of the Americas (also known as the News Corp. Building), New York City. On March 20, 2018, Hannity temporarily relocated to Studio F from its original location in Studio J for construction. The program went back to renovated Studio J on June 5, 2018.

See also 
 The Sean Hannity Show

References

External links 
 

Fox News original programming
2009 American television series debuts
2000s American television talk shows
2010s American television talk shows
2020s American television talk shows
Conservative media in the United States
Sean Hannity